Works for Me is an album by John Scofield which was released  by Verve on January 30, 2001.

Track listing
All compositions by John Scofield except "Freepie" by John Scofield, Brad Mehldau, Christian McBride, Billy Higgins and Kenny Garrett
"I'll Catch You"
"Not You Again"
"Big J"
"Loose Canon"
"Love You Long Time"
"Hive"
"Heel to Toe"
"Do I Crazy?"
"Mrs. Scofield's Waltz"
"Six and Eight"
"Freepie"

Personnel
 John Scofield – electric guitar
 Kenny Garrett – alto saxophone
 Brad Mehldau – piano
 Christian McBride – double bass
 Billy Higgins – drums

References 

Works for Me
Works for Me
Works for Me